Kalam Tv is a social networking website, based primarily on video sharing. Initially launched on February, 2008 to meet the needs and the preferences of the people in the Middle East in terms of sharing and creating original videos, but it expanded services to Iran and Pakistan in mid-2009. It is a part of Tower Media Middle East located in Dubai Media City.

Features 

Videos are uploaded at Kalam by registered users only where they can create, customize their channels and profile with avatar, background and header images. The website has features like Video embedding, downloading, sharing publicly or privately, user-commenting, rating, play lists. Users can make friends, chat and can watch videos in low or high quality.

Content 

Video content is categorized such as Drama, Film, Poetry, Jokes, Fashion, Sports, Music, Cooking, Talk shows, News Content, Citizen Journalism. The website does not allow any copyrighted material to be shared.

Arabic 
The Arabic section include various TV shows from Al Aan TV including Al Layla Shellatna  go live on web via Kalam TV as soon as they are aired on TV.

Persian 
Kalam Farsi gives voice to Iranian and Persian-speaking community around the world. It is compliant with Iran's Internet regulatory authority, Telecommunication Company of Iran. Kalam Farsi was the first online resource for Iranian President Mahmoud Ahmadinejad's exclusive interview on Al Aan TV

Urdu 
The Urdu section focuses on citizen journalists from Pakistan and is the only video sharing website for Urdu speakers. Major content comes from ordinary citizen reporters as well as media partners which include Geo Tv, Punjab Tv. A weekly 20 minute infomercial named Kalam Hum Kalam is aired every Saturday on Geo TV.

Merger 

As of December 2011, Kalam TV content was completely merged with Al Aan TV.

References

External links 
 Official Website Kalam.tv
 Official Website of Al Aan TV

Video hosting
Emirati social networking websites